Superfuse is an action role-playing video game in a comic book art style. The game is in early access as of early 2023.

Gameplay 

Superfuse is an action role-playing video game in a comic book art style and superhero characters. The player hacks and slashes at enemy mobs in procedurally generated levels and upgrades their powers through a configurable skill tree as they progress.

Development 

Superfuse is in development by Dutch studio Stitch Heads. After a multiplayer beta test in December 2022, the game opened for early access the next month with two character classes. It will be published by Raw Fury.

The developers plan to create five character classes and support four-player cooperative play.

References

Further reading

External links 

 

Upcoming video games
Action role-playing video games
Multiplayer and single-player video games
Early access video games
Raw Fury games
Video games developed in the Netherlands
Windows games